Iran participated in the 2002 Winter Olympics in Salt Lake City, United States. Two athletes represented Iran in the 2002 Olympics, one in alpine skiing and one in cross-country skiing.

Competitors

Results by event

Skiing

Alpine

Men

Cross-country

Men

References

External links
Official Olympic Reports

Nations at the 2002 Winter Olympics
2002 Winter Olympics
Winter Olympics